Slivník, formerly Silvaš is a village and municipality in the Trebišov District in the Košice Region of eastern Slovakia.

History 
Slivník was first mentioned in 1321.

Villages and municipalities in Trebišov District